John Worrall (26 May 1927 – 6 May 2012) was a New Zealand cricketer. He played nine first-class matches for Auckland between 1951 and 1955.

See also
 List of Auckland representative cricketers

References

External links
 

1927 births
2012 deaths
New Zealand cricketers
Auckland cricketers
Cricketers from Auckland